Caladenia sanguinea, commonly known as red spider orchid or crimson daddy long-legs, is a species of orchid endemic to South Australia. It has a single sparsely hairy leaf and one or two dark red flowers with long, thin sepals and petals.

Description
The sepals and petals have long, thin, thread-like tips. The sides of the labellum have short, broad teeth, the tip of the labellum is curled under and there are two rows of red, anvil-shaped calli along the mid-line of the labellum. Flowering occurs from August to October.

Taxonomy and naming
Caladenia sanguinea was first described in 1999 by David Jones from a specimen collected on Kangaroo Island and the description was published in The Orchadian. The specific epithet (sanguinea) is a Latin word meaning "blood", "bloody" or "blood-red".

Distribution and habitat
Crimson daddy long-legs is only found in the Eyre Peninsula, Yorke Peninsula and Kangaroo Island botanical regions of South Australia where it grows in mallee woodland and heath.

Conservation
Caladenia sanguinea is classified as "rare" in South Australia.

References

sanguinea
Endemic orchids of Australia
Orchids of South Australia
Plants described in 1999
Taxa named by David L. Jones (botanist)